New Madrid County is a county located in the Bootheel of the U.S. state of Missouri. As of the 2020 census, the population was 16,434. The largest city and county seat is New Madrid, located on the northern side of the Kentucky Bend in the Mississippi River, where it has formed an oxbow around an exclave of Fulton County, Kentucky. This feature has also been known as New Madrid Bend or Madrid Bend, for the city.

The county was officially organized on October 1, 1812, and is named after Nuevo Madrid, a district located in the region. This area was under Spanish rule following France's cession of Louisiana after being defeated in the Seven Years' War. The Spanish named the district after Madrid, the capital of Spain.

The county includes a large part of the New Madrid Fault that produced the 1811–12 New Madrid earthquakes. This zone remains geologically active, and had continued to produce smaller earthquakes with some frequency.

History
French Canadians from New France landed in this area in 1781 and established the first European settlement in the present county at New Madrid along the Mississippi River. France had ceded this area to Spain following its loss in the Seven Years' War. The Spanish governor, Bernardo de Gálvez, appointed American colonel William Morgan, a Revolutionary War veteran from New Jersey, as empresario to recruit new settlers for the area. Morgan attracted about 2,000 settlers before Spain returned this territory to France in the late 18th century. They settled mostly in the area of what is now the city of New Madrid, Missouri. After failing to regain control of its colony of Saint-Domingue, where a slave rebellion had been raging, France gave up on North America, selling its large territory west of the Mississippi River in 1803 to the United States under the Louisiana Purchase.

New Madrid County was organized on October 1, 1812, as an act of the First General Assembly of the Missouri Territory. In the floodplain of the Mississippi, this area was long cultivated by planters using enslaved African Americans for cotton production.

A series of more than 1,000 earthquakes struck the area in 1811 and 1812. The New Madrid earthquakes were the strongest non-subduction zone earthquake in the United States. A request dated January 13, 1814, by the Territorial Governor William Clark, asked for federal relief for the "inhabitants of New Madrid County."

The county had its peak of population in 1940, according to US census records, as shown in the table. Many residents left the rural county from 1950 to 1970, seeking better work opportunities in the North and Midwest. County population has continued to decline. In 2017 the county was featured in an episode of Madrid de sol a sol, a show from Spanish public channel Telemadrid exploring locations named "Madrid".

Geography

The county is located on the Kentucky Bend of the Mississippi River, which forms a border of the county. This feature is also known as New Madrid Bend or Madrid Bend. This oxbow flows around an exclave of Fulton County, Kentucky. Scientists expect that eventually the river will cut a new channel across the narrow neck of the peninsula, which will gradually be attached by infill land to Missouri.

Adjacent counties
Scott County (north)
Mississippi County (northeast)
Fulton County, Kentucky (south and east across the Mississippi river)
Lake County, Tennessee (south across the river)
Pemiscot County (south)
Dunklin County (southwest)
Stoddard County (northwest)

Major highways
 Interstate 55
 U.S. Route 60
 U.S. Route 61
 U.S. Route 62
 Route 153
 Route 162

Demographics

As of the census of 2000, there were 19,760 people, 7,824 households, and 5,508 families residing in the county. The population density was 29 people per square mile (11/km2). There were 8,600 housing units at an average density of 13 per square mile (5/km2). The racial makeup of the county was 83.21% White, 15.36% Black or African American, 0.19% Native American, 0.14% Asian, 0.01% Pacific Islander, 0.32% from other races, and 0.78% from two or more races. Approximately 0.93% of the population were Hispanic or Latino of any race. Among the major first ancestries reported in New Madrid County were 32.4% American, 10.3% Irish, 8.8% English, and 8.7% German ancestry.

There were 7,824 households, out of which 32.80% had children under the age of 18 living with them, 52.00% were married couples living together, 14.60% had a female householder with no husband present, and 29.60% were non-families. 26.50% of all households were made up of individuals, and 13.20% had someone living alone who was 65 years of age or older. The average household size was 2.48 and the average family size was 2.99.

In the county, the population was spread out, with 26.40% under the age of 18, 8.50% from 18 to 24, 26.40% from 25 to 44, 23.20% from 45 to 64, and 15.50% who were 65 years of age or older. The median age was 37 years. For every 100 females there were 92.40 males. For every 100 females age 18 and over, there were 86.50 males.

The median income for a household in the county was $32,758, and the median income for a family was $39,411. Males had a median income of $28,408 versus $19,186 for females. The per capita income for the county was $17,227. About 18.60% of families and 22.10% of the population were below the poverty line, including 31.40% of those under age 18 and 19.20% of those age 65 or over.

Religion
According to the Association of Religion Data Archives County Membership Report (2000), New Madrid County is a part of the Bible Belt as evangelical Protestantism is the majority religion. The most predominant denominations among residents in New Madrid County who adhere to a religion are Southern Baptists (62.86%), Roman Catholics (8.80%), and Methodists (7.36%).

2020 Census

Politics

Local
The Democratic Party formerly almost completely controlled politics at the local level in New Madrid County. Democrats and Republicans now almost evenly split all elected positions in the county.

State
New Madrid County is wholly encompassed by the 149th Missouri House of Representatives district and is currently represented by Republican Don Rone of Portageville.

In the Missouri Senate, all of New Madrid County is a part of Missouri's 25th District and is currently represented by Republican Jason Bean of Poplar Bluff.

Federal
New Madrid County is included in Missouri's 8th Congressional District and is currently represented by Jason T. Smith (R-Salem) in the U.S. House of Representatives. Smith won a special election on Tuesday, June 4, 2013, to finish out the remaining term of U.S. Representative Jo Ann Emerson (R-Cape Girardeau). Emerson announced her resignation a month after being reelected with over 70 percent of the vote in the district. She resigned to become CEO of the National Rural Electric Cooperative.

New Madrid County, along with the rest of the state of Missouri, is represented in the U.S. Senate by Josh Hawley (R-Columbia) and Roy Blunt (R-Strafford).

Blunt was elected to a second term in 2016 over then-Missouri Secretary of State Jason Kander.

Political culture

At the presidential level, New Madrid County, lying in the Missouri Bootheel (one of the regions of Missouri most closely associated with the American South), was powerfully Democratic from shortly after the Civil War through 2000; from 1868 through 2000, it voted Republican only in Harding's, Hoover's, Nixon's, and Reagan's national landslides in 1920, 1928, 1972, and 1984, respectively. However, after the county switched from Gore to Bush in 2004, it has become a Republican stronghold, having, as of 2020, voted Republican five elections in a row, with the Republican vote share increasing in every election. In 2020, Trump exceeded three-quarters of the vote in the county.

Voters in New Madrid County generally adhere to socially and culturally conservative principles but are more moderate or populist on economic issues, typical of the Dixiecrat philosophy. In 2004, Missourians voted on a constitutional amendment to define marriage as the union between a man and a woman. New Madrid County passed it with 83.82 percent of the vote. The initiative passed the state with 71 percent support as Missouri became the first state to ban same-sex marriage. In 2006, Missourians voted on a constitutional amendment to fund and legalize embryonic stem cell research in the state—it failed in New Madrid County with 56.09 percent voting against the measure. The initiative narrowly passed the state with 51 percent of support from voters as Missouri became one of the first states in the nation to approve embryonic stem cell research.

Despite New Madrid County's longstanding tradition of supporting socially conservative platforms, voters in the county support such populist causes as increasing the minimum wage. In 2006, Missourians voted on a proposition (Proposition B) to increase the minimum wage in the state to $6.50 an hour—it passed New Madrid County with 75.66 percent of the vote. The proposition was strongly in every county in Missouri, with 78.99 percent voting in favor. During the same election, voters in five other states also strongly approved increases in the minimum wage.

Missouri presidential preference primary (2008)

In the 2008 presidential primary, voters in New Madrid County from both political parties supported candidates who finished in second place in the state at large and nationally. Former U.S. Senator Hillary Clinton (D-New York) received more votes, a total of 1,801, than any candidate from either party in New Madrid County during the 2008 presidential primary. She also received more votes than the total number of votes cast in the entire Republican Primary in New Madrid County.

Education
Of adults 25 years of age and older in New Madrid County, 63.6% possess a high school diploma or higher while 9.6% hold a bachelor's degree or higher as their highest educational attainment.

Public schools
Gideon School District 37 - Gideon
Gideon Elementary School (K-6)
Gideon High School (7-12)
New Madrid County Central R-I School District - New Madrid
Lilbourn Elementary School (PK-5) - Lilbourn
Matthews Elementary School (PK-5) - Matthews
New Madrid County Central Elementary School (PK-5)
New Madrid County Central Middle School (6-08)
New Madrid County Central High School (9-12)
Portageville School District - Portageville
Portageville Elementary School (PK-5)
Portageville Middle School (6-8)
Portageville High School (9-12)
Risco R-II School District - Risco
Risco Elementary School (K-6)
Risco High School (7-12)

Private schools
St. Eustachius Elementary School - Portageville - (PK-8) - Roman Catholic
Immaculate Conception School - New Madrid - (PK-8) - Roman Catholic

Alternative/vocational schools
New Madrid Bend Youth Center - New Madrid - (6-12) - Alternative
New Madrid R-I Technical Skills Center - New Madrid - (9-12) - Vocational/Technical

Public libraries
Lilbourn Memorial Library  
New Madrid County Library

Communities

Cities and Towns

Canalou
Catron
Gideon
Howardville
Lilbourn
Marston
Matthews
Morehouse
New Madrid (county seat)
North Lilbourn
Parma
Portageville (partly in Pemiscot County)
Risco
Sikeston (mostly in Scott County)
Tallapoosa

Unincorporated Communities

 Bayouville
 Big Ridge
 Boekerton
 Broadwater
 Como
 Conran
 Dodds
 Farrenburg
 Hartzell
 Hurricane Ridge
 Kewanee
 La Forge
 Lorwood
 Noxall
 Point Pleasant
 Ristine

See also
National Register of Historic Places listings in New Madrid County, Missouri
New Madrid Floodway Project
New Madrid Seismic Zone

References

External links
Digitized 1930 Plat Book of New Madrid County  from University of Missouri Division of Special Collections, Archives, and Rare Books

 
1812 establishments in Missouri Territory
Populated places established in 1812
Missouri counties on the Mississippi River